Robert Kerr Chisholm (May 26, 1819 – February 27, 1899) was a political figure in Oakville, Ontario, serving as mayor in 1866.

He was born in Nelson Township in Upper Canada in 1819, the son of William Chisholm, and was educated in Hamilton. Chisholm served as reeve of Trafalgar Township in 1854 and 1856 and served on the Oakville town council from 1857 to 1871 and 1879 to 1880. He also served as customs collector and postmaster in Oakville after his father's death in 1842; until that time, he had assisted his father with both of these functions.

He died in Oakville in 1899.

His brother George King served in the Legislative Assembly of the province and was the first mayor of Oakville.

See also
List of mayors of Oakville, Ontario

References

1819 births
1899 deaths
Mayors of Oakville, Ontario